The coat of arms of the Mexican state of Tabasco, has four sections. The top left has four golden castle towers, for the Spanish Kingdom of Castile. The bottom left a native with a bunch of flowers for the fertility of the farming land. The bottom right has a golden lion for the Spanish kingdom of León. The top right has an arm holding a shield and sword, for the military power of Spain. In the middle is an oval with the Virgin Mary, for the Catholic Church in the state. The silver and red backgrounds are for the loyalty of Tabasco, and the protection of Spain.

Seals of country subdivisions
Tabasco